St. Matthew's Cathedral is the Anglican cathedral of the Anglican Diocese of Moosonee. It is located in Timmins, Ontario, and celebrated its centenary in 2013.

References
 

St. Matthew's
Buildings and structures in Timmins
Anglican church buildings in Ontario
20th-century Anglican church buildings in Canada